Snehaloka is a 1999 Indian Kannada-language romantic drama film directed by S. Mahendar and produced by N. Bharathi Devi. The film has an ensemble cast comprising Ramesh Aravind, Ramkumar, Shashikumar, Vinod Raj and Anu Prabhakar.

This film is the Kannada remake of Tamil blockbuster film Kannedhirey Thondrinal (1998). The film was also made in Malayalam as Dhosth (2001).

The film released on 24 December 1999 to generally positive reviews from critics who lauded the lead actors performance and the musical score by Hamsalekha.

Cast

Soundtrack

This film music was composed and written by Hamsalekha. A breathless song "Onde Usiranthe" was recorded in the voices of Rajesh Krishnan and K. S. Chitra which was widely appreciated. Sonu Nigam also sang his second number in Kannada whose soundtrack was inspired by Celine Dion's "My Heart Will Go On" from the soundtrack of the film Titanic (1997). The album consists of seven tracks.

Reception 
Srikanth Srinivasa of Deccan Herald called the film a "tear-jerker mould with a light and clean social entertainer." Of the acting performances, he wrote, "Ramesh fits the bill perfectly especially after shedding oodles of adipose. Ramesh has added another dimension to his acting capability. Ramkumar has definitely matured as an actor. Anu Prabhakar is a sweet delight to watch. Sharan seems to have a natural flair for comedy and his dialogues are timed well and so does Michael. Vinod Raj impresses in his brief sojourn. Shashi Kumar looks out of place but has a role to play in the end."

References

External links 
 
 film preview

1999 films
1990s Kannada-language films
Indian romantic drama films
Kannada remakes of Tamil films
Indian buddy films
1990s buddy films
Films scored by Hamsalekha
Films directed by S. Mahendar
1999 romantic drama films